Nuštar is a village  and municipality in eastern Croatia, located northeast of Vinkovci and west of Vukovar, on the route D55. The population of Nuštar is 3,639, with a total of 5,772 people in the municipality, which also includes the nearby villages of Cerić and Marinci (census 2011). Nuštar is underdeveloped municipality which is statistically classified as the First Category Area of Special State Concern by the Government of Croatia.

History

The name Nuštar comes from monasterium, because a Benedictine monastery of the Holy Spirit existed there in 1263. The nobleman Nikola Berzeta acquired the estate in the 14th century, and in the 15th century it was owned by the Gorjanski family. A castle that was owned by the Khuen-Belassy family was expanded and had a church built within it in the 18th century. This church was renovated during the 19th century and the castle is now surrounded by a park. Ban of Croatia-Slavonia Károly Khuen-Héderváry spent most of his childhood at the estate.

Nuštar suffered major damage during the Croatian War of Independence, when it was surrounded by the rebel Serb forces and often shelled. When Vukovar fell in the Battle of Vukovar, Nuštar was the main extraction point for survivors and the village itself became surrounded from three directions. The parish church of the Holy Spirit suffered extensive damage in the war, which has since been repaired.

References

Municipalities of Croatia
Populated places in Syrmia
Populated places in Vukovar-Syrmia County